Lars Edvin Folke Ryding (born 4 February 2003) is a Swedish actor. He debuted in the TV series Mannen under trappan in 2009 at the age of 6 years. Since then Ryding has acted in several other productions like Fröken Frimans krig, The Crown Jewels, The Stig-Helmer Story, Gåsmamman, and several of the films about Annika Bengtzon produced in 2011. He became known internationally with the leading role in the 2021 Netflix show Young Royals, where he plays the character Prince Wilhelm. He had the leading voice role in the Swedish language children's animated film Resan till Fjäderkungens rike. Ryding was featured in Europe's Forbes 30 under 30 list of 2022.

Filmography

Film

Television

Awards and nominations

References

External links
 Edvin Ryding at Agentfirman
 
 
 

2003 births
21st-century Swedish male actors
Living people
Male actors from Stockholm
Swedish male child actors
Swedish male film actors
Swedish male television actors
Swedish male voice actors